Not an Apology is the debut studio album by American singer-songwriter Bea Miller. It was released on July 24, 2015, by Syco Music and Hollywood Records exclusively in United States and Canada. It includes all four tracks from her debut EP, Young Blood (2014).

Background
In April 2013, Miller announced that she was signed to Syco Music and Hollywood Records, marking the first collaborative arrangement between the two labels. On March 17, 2015, the album's title was confirmed by Headline Planet to be Not an Apology along with a release date of July 24, 2015. It was only released in the United States and Canada.

Commercial performance
Not an Apology debuted at No. 7 on the Billboard 200 with 33,000 units, of which 24,000 are pure album sales.

Singles

"Young Blood" was released on April 22, 2015 along with Bea's debut EP, Young Blood. It had moderate success being used on American Idol and receiving praise from fans. It peaked on a few charts and barely failed to peak on the Billboard Hot 100. However, the song was received well from critics.

The second single released was "Fire n Gold" and is Bea's most successful single to date. The song had an outstanding success and was released to radios on April 28, 2015. The song has been used in Netflix commercials and has been praised by many fans and famous singers. The single became Bea's first single to chart on the Billboard Hot 100 at No. 78. Due to the success of the single, it remained Bea's single for majority of 2015. The music video was released on May 14, 2015. The single has been certified Gold in the United States, with 500,000 copies sold.

Track listing

Charts

Release history

References

2015 debut albums
Hollywood Records albums
Syco Music albums
Bea Miller albums
Pop rock albums by American artists